The St. Charles-Muller's Hotel, at 302-304-310 S. Carson St. in Carson City, Nevada, is a historic hotel built in 1862.  It has also been known as the St. Charles Hotel and as the Pony Express Hotel.  It includes vernacular Italianate architecture.

It was listed on the National Register of Historic Places in 1982.

It faces across Carson Street (U.S. 395) towards the Nevada State Capitol and is the oldest surviving brick building on Main Street.  It is also the longest continuously operating hotel in the State of Nevada.

References

External links
A Guide to the Registers for the St. Charles Hotel, NC279. Special Collections, University Libraries, University of Nevada, Reno.

Italianate architecture in Nevada
Hotel buildings completed in 1862
Hotels in Nevada
National Register of Historic Places in Carson City, Nevada
Hotel buildings on the National Register of Historic Places in Nevada
1862 establishments in Nevada Territory